Simon Climie (born 7 April 1957) is an English songwriter/producer and the former lead singer of the UK duo Climie Fisher.

Biography

Climie was born in London. Beginning his career primarily as a songwriter/session musician, Climie found himself scoring early hits by the mid-1980s with compositions recorded by George Michael and Aretha Franklin ("I Knew You Were Waiting (for Me)") and Pat Benatar ("Invincible").  He also wrote songs appearing on albums by such artists as Frida, Smokey Robinson, and Jeff Beck during this time. Then, on the fringes of session work, he did the Fairlight programming for Scritti Politti's album Cupid & Psyche.

Later in the 1980s, he formed Climie Fisher together with Rob Fisher, whom he had met when they were both session musicians at Abbey Road Studios. With Climie fronting the group, Climie Fisher had hits in many territories, with the singles "Love Changes (Everything)", which won an Ivor Novello Award, "Rise to the Occasion", "This Is Me" and more.  Concurrent with his time in Climie Fisher, Climie continued with songwriting, landing another big hit in 1988 with Rod Stewart's recording of "My Heart Can't Tell You No".

After leaving EMI and the final Climie Fisher album Coming in for the Kill, Climie signed to Sony's Columbia label as a solo artist, releasing an album called Soul Inspiration in 1992.

In the mid-1990s Climie expanded to production, while continuing his songwriting career, producing and writing songs for a number of artists, including Eternal, Louise Redknapp, B.B. King, and Zucchero Fornaciari.  

As the 90s progressed, Climie began a long-time collaboration with Eric Clapton beginning with his albums Pilgrim, Reptile, Riding with the King, Me And Mr. Johnson, Back Home and The Road to Escondido.  In addition, he embarked on a similar musical partnership with Michael McDonald, producing McDonald's Motown, Motown II and Soul Speak albums. The third of these featured collaborations with Stevie Wonder and Toni Braxton, while the Grammy-nominated Motown spawned the US hit cover of "Ain't No Mountain High Enough".

Climie's songwriting success continued into the 2010s, with Sara Evans cracking the American country music charts for more than six months with her cover of "My Heart Can't Tell You No", while Chris Medina – who had already reached number one in a number of territories around the world with his first single –  collaborated with Climie on his second single, "One More Time", and several songs on the album What Are Words.

Together with U2 member Larry Mullen, Jr., Climie has co-written the film score and theme for Man on the Train (2011 TriBeCa Productions film) in which Larry stars with Donald Sutherland.

In 2013, he worked on production and mixing of Eric Clapton's album Old Sock, which shot to number one in the American Billboard Independent Chart in March 2013  after hitting number seven in the Billboard 200   In 2014, Climie was co-producer again with Eric Clapton of the album The Breeze: An Appreciation of JJ Cale, a tribute to Clapton's long time friend, the late singer/songwriter J.J. Cale.

In 2016, Climie was the co-producer with Clapton on the album Live in San Diego which was recorded during the "Doyle & Derek World Tour" in 2007.

As a producer, Climie has won two Grammys for the albums Riding with the King in 2000 and The Road to Escondido in 2007. He received another Grammy nomination for Pilgrim in 1998.

Personal life
Climie is the son of David Climie, co-writer of the 1960s and 1970s television comedy series, Oh, Brother!, which starred Derek Nimmo. as well as Lulu's Back in Town (see Lulu), the comedy series Bootsie and Snudge, Backs to the Land, Wodehouse Playhouse, That Was The Week That Was, The Army Game, the sci-fi series Out of the Unknown, the radio version of Whack-O! and the comedy film Desert Mice.

Discography

Includes songs and albums Climie has written, performed and/or produced.

Albums
 Everything (as part of Climie Fisher - 1987)
 Coming In for the Kill (as part of Climie Fisher - 1989)
 Soul Inspiration (solo - 1992) – (Soul Inspiration / Does Your Heart Still Break / Love in the Right Hands / Dream With Me / Oh How The Years Go By / Don’t Give Up So Easy / Spell / Don’t Waste Time (Make Your Move) / Losing You / Life Goes On)
 Retail Therapy - T.D.F. (Production & Writing)
 Pilgrim – Eric Clapton (1998, Production & Writing)
 Riding with the King – BB King & Eric Clapton (2000, Production)
 Motown I - Michael McDonald - (Production)
 Reptile – Eric Clapton (2001, Production & Writing)
 One More Car, One More Rider – Eric Clapton (2002, Production & Writing)
 Motown II - Michael McDonald - (Production)
 Me and Mr. Johnson – Eric Clapton (2004, Production)
 Back Home – Eric Clapton (2005, Production & Writing)
 Soul Speak - Michael McDonald (Production & Writing)
 Lara Fabian - TLFM
 Chris Medina - What Are Words
 Live in San Diego – Eric Clapton (2016, Production)

Singles
 Pat Benatar – "Invincible" (US Top Ten)  
 Maxine – 1984
 Westlife – "World of Our Own"
 Climie Fisher – "Love Changes (Everything)"
 Climie Fisher – "Rise to the Occasion"
 Climie Fisher – "This Is Me"
 Eric Clapton – "My Father's Eyes"  (won Grammy Award for Best Male Pop Vocal Performance in 1999)
 Eric Clapton – "(I) Get Lost"
George Michael and Aretha Franklin - "I knew you were waiting (for me)" (1987) (co-writer)
 Michael McDonald – "Ain't No Mountain High Enough"
 Eternal – "Someday"
 Zucchero Fornaciari "Everybody's Got to Learn Sometime"
 "Soul Inspiration"
 "Does Your Heart Still Break"
 "Oh How the Years Go By"
 Rod Stewart, Sara Evans - "My Heart Can't Tell You No"
 Chris Medina – "One More Time"

T.D.F.
T.D.F. was a dance act project featuring Climie and Eric Clapton, with Clapton working under the name of x-sample. "TDF" is an acronym for Totally Dysfunctional Family. The project released one album called Retail Therapy'' on the Reprise record label. The title supposedly alludes to Clapton's "addiction" to buying clothes. Eric Clapton states in his autobiography that he persuaded Giorgio Armani, a friend of Clapton's, to let them do the music for one of his fashion shows. The track "Seven" from the album contains a sample of B. B. King's "How Blue Can You Get".

Discography

Albums

References

External links
 Simon Climie Songs Latest News
 Simon Climie Songs Playlist
 Simon Climie songwriting credits

1957 births
Living people
English keyboardists
English record producers
English male guitarists
English male singers
English songwriters
Eric Clapton
Grammy Award winners
Singers from London
Climie Fisher members